

195001–195100 

|-bgcolor=#f2f2f2
| colspan=4 align=center | 
|}

195101–195200 

|-id=191
| 195191 Constantinetsang ||  || Constantine C. C. Tsang (born 1981) is a Senior Research Scientist at the Southwest Research Institute, and served as a Science Team Collaborator for imaging data analysis for the New Horizons mission to Pluto. || 
|}

195201–195300 

|-bgcolor=#f2f2f2
| colspan=4 align=center | 
|}

195301–195400 

|-bgcolor=#f2f2f2
| colspan=4 align=center | 
|}

195401–195500 

|-id=405
| 195405 Lentyler ||  || G. Leonard Tyler (born 1940), formerly of Stanford University, worked for the New Horizons mission to Pluto as a Science Team Co-investigator and as the REX instrument radio science principal investigator || 
|}

195501–195600 

|-id=600
| 195600 Scheithauer ||  || Christian Friedrich Scheithauer (1771–1846), a German teacher and amateur astronomer from Chemnitz || 
|}

195601–195700 

|-id=657
| 195657 Zhuangqining ||  || Zhuangqining (born 1945), a Chinese teacher and the first Secretary-General of the Ningbo Astronomy Amateur Association || 
|}

195701–195800 

|-id=777
| 195777 Sheepman ||  || Sheepman, a fictional character featured in the novels A Wild Sheep Chase and Dance Dance Dance by Japanese writer Haruki Murakami. The Sheepman is a shabby but oracular creature and appears as an unshaven man dressed in sheepskin who instructs the protagonist to "dance so it all keeps spinning." || 
|}

195801–195900 

|-id=900
| 195900 Rogersudbury ||  || Roger Sudbury (born 1938) provided leadership and expertise in the national security community since joining the Massachusetts Institute of Technology's Lincoln Laboratory in 1969. As a key senior leader at the Laboratory, he assisted in initiating the LINEAR Ceres Connection program. || 
|}

195901–196000 

|-id=998
| 195998 Skipwilson ||  || Ivan "Skip" Wilson (born 1941), pioneer of systematic meteorite recovery || 
|-id=000
| 196000 Izzard ||  || Eddie Izzard (born 1962), a British stand-up comic and dramatic actor || 
|}

References 

195001-196000